Queen Jangseon of the Jiksan Choe clan was a Goryeo queen consort as the second wife of King Uijong, her maternal first cousin. Her life wasn't described in too much detail as there's only a record of her becoming Uijong's queen consort on 6 August 1148, following her father's death that same year.

Family  
 Father - Choe Dan (최단, 崔端) (? - 1148)
 Grandfather - Choe Hong-jae (최홍재, 崔弘宰) (? - 1135)
 Mother - Lady Im of the Jangheung Im clan (장흥 임씨)
 Grandfather - Im Won-hu (임원후, 任元厚) (1089 - 1156)
 Grandmother - Grand Lady Jinhan of the Yi clan (진한국대부인 이씨, 韓國大夫人 李氏) (? - 1138)
 Aunt - Queen Gongye of the Jangheung Im clan (공예왕후 임씨) (2 October 1109 – 2 December 1183)
 Uncle - Wang Hae, Injong of Goryeo (고려 인종) (29 October 1109 - 10 April 1146)
 Cousin - Wang Hyeon, Uijong of Goryeo (고려 의종) (23 May 1127 - 7 July 1173)
 Cousin-in-law - Queen Janggyeong of the Gangneung Kim clan (장경왕후 김씨)
 Cousin - Princess Seunggyeong (승경궁주) (? - 1158)
 Cousin - Wang Gyeong, Marquess Daeryeong (대령후) (1130 - 1167?)
 Cousin - Wang Ho, Myeongjong of Goryeo (고려 명종) (8 November 1131 - 3 December 1202)
 Cousin-in-law - Queen Uijeong of the Gangneung Kim clan (의정왕후 김씨) (? - 1170?)
 Cousin - Wang Chung-hui (왕충희) or Wongyeongguksa (원경국사) (? - 1183)
 Cousin - Princess Deoknyeong (덕녕궁주) (? - 1192)
 Cousin - Princess Changrak (창락궁주) (? - 1216)
 Cousin - Princess Yeonghwa (영화궁주) (1141 - 1208)
 Cousin - Wang Tak, Sinjong of Goryeo (고려 신종) (11 November 1144 - 15 February 1204)
 Cousin-in-law - Queen Seonjeong of the Gangneung Kim clan (선정왕후 김씨) (? - 1222)
 Husband - Wang Hyeon, Uijong of Goryeo (고려 의종) (23 May 1127 - 7 July 1173) — No issue.
 Mother-in-law - Queen Gongye of the Jangheung Im clan (공예왕후 임씨) (2 October 1109 – 2 December 1183)
 Father-in-law - Wang Hae, Injong of Goryeo (고려 인종) (29 October 1109 - 10 April 1146)

References

External links
Queen Jangseon on Encykorea .
장선왕후 on Doosan Encyclopedia .

Royal consorts of the Goryeo Dynasty
Korean queens consort
Year of birth unknown
Year of death unknown